Abacetus abor is a species of ground beetle in the subfamily Pterostichinae. It was described by Herbert Edward Andrewes in 1942 and is found in India.

References

abor
Beetles described in 1942
Insects of India